Faraz Rabbani is a Pakistani-Canadian Islamic scholar, instructor in online Islamic institutes, of which he has been a developer, and the translator of books on Islamic teachings.

Work
Faraz Rabbani is the founder, education director, and instructor at SeekersGuidance (formerly SeekersHub Global), an online educational institute which has a Q&A service, online courses, and occasional retreats. He carries the title of sheikh. From 2011 to 2018 he served as executive director of SeekersHub Toronto in Mississauga, Ontario, Canada, which was reestablished as SeekersGuidance Canada in 2019. Before that he was a central figure with SunniPath, an online Islamic institute, and has, according to one publication "continuously been at the vanguard of effectively utilizing the latest web technologies and services to teach Islam in the West for over a decade." He has issued a fatwa against all forms of domestic violence including physical, emotional, and spoken forms.

He is listed in the 2017 edition of The Muslim 500 as one of the world's 500 most influential Muslims.

Publications

 Absolute Essentials of Islam: Faith, Prayer, and the Path of Salvation According to the Hanafi School (Santa Barbara: White Thread Press, 2004)

References

External links
SeekersGuidance - Where Faraz Rabbani's lessons may be found
Faraz Rabbani audio and video lectures
Islamic Finance Affairs - Articles, answers, and news on Islamic Finance, run by Rabbani

Canadian bloggers
Canadian people of Pakistani descent
Blogs about Muslims and Islam
Hanafi fiqh scholars
People from Karachi
People from Toronto
Living people
1974 births
Canadian Sunni Muslims
University of Toronto alumni